The Mövenpick Hotel Ramallah is a five-star hotel located in Ramallah. It cost $42.5 million (£26.4m) to build.

The hotel was first conceived in the 1990s but was delayed due to the political unrest that followed. Construction began in 2000 and was completed 10 years later in November 2010. Progress was hindered by difficulties and delays relating to the importing of goods into the territory from Israel.

The hotel contains five restaurants and bars, 171 rooms including two presidential suites, a range of luxury banqueting and conference facilities, a heated outdoor pool, a gym.

The hotel is aimed principally at a business clientele, and it also hopes to attract the growing number of tourists and pilgrims visiting the West Bank.

References

External links

 

Hotels in the State of Palestine
Hotels established in 2010
Hotel buildings completed in 2010
Buildings and structures in Ramallah

2010 establishments in the Palestinian territories